Is It Love? Ultra Naté Best Remixes, Vol. 1 is a compilation consisting of remixes of the singles from Ultra Naté's first album, Blue Notes in the Basement. This compilation was released on November 17, 1998.

Track listing 

 Is It Love? (Club Mix)
 Scandal (Club Mix)
 It's Over Now (Tony Humphries Mix)
 Deeper Love (The Leftfield Vocal Mix)
 Rejoicing (Deee-Liteful Stomp Mix)
 It's Over Now (Dancin' Danny D Mix)
 Rejoicing (Gospel Stomp Mix)
 It's Over Now (Original Classic Mix)

External links
[ All Music: The Best Remixes, Vol. 1]

Ultra Naté albums
1999 remix albums
Warner Records remix albums